J.J. North (born December 13, 1964) is an American actress, best known for her role in the science-fiction film Attack of the 60 Foot Centerfold  (1995).

Career
After winning a beauty contest,  she made her film début in Beauty School (1993), starring Sylvia Kristel.  North appeared in seventeen films between 1993 and 1999.

Filmography

Beauty School  (1993)
The Troma System (1993)
Head Games (1993) (video)
The New Video Vixens (1994)
Animal Room (1995)
Attack of the 60 Foot Centerfold (1995)
Depraved (1995)
Vampire Vixens from Venus (1995)
Vicious Kiss  (1995)
Psycho Sisters 2: Beyond the Brink of Madness (1996)
Red Lips II (1996)
Vice Academy 5 (1996)
Bikini Hotel (1997)
Hybrid (1997)
Psycho Sisters (1998)
Hellblock 13 (1999) (V)

References

External links

Actresses from New Jersey
Actresses from Philadelphia
American film actresses
20th-century American actresses
Living people
Montclair State University alumni
1964 births
21st-century American women